Keep the Love-Light Burning in the Window Till the Boys Come Marching Home is a World War I song with music and lyrics by Jack Caddigan and Jimmy McHugh. It was first published in May, 1917, a month after the United States entered World War I, by D. W. Cooper Publishing Co., in Boston, MA. By October, Chappell & Co. had brought suit, alleging that the title and refrain violated copyright on the British song, "Keep the Home-Fires Burning." Cooper settled out of court by agreeing to release a second edition, copyrighted October 23, 1917, with revised lyrics and the title "Keep the Love-Light Shining in the Window." In the meantime, Jos. W. Stern & Co. had acquired sole selling rights, and its imprint, along with Cooper's, appeared on the new version. A final edition, issued after Stern & Co. actually acquired the copyright, appeared in 1918.

The publishing history, as well as the number of surviving copies (at, for instance, the Pritzker Military Museum & Library), suggests that the song achieved national success, although it was never recorded and no piano rolls were made. It was popular with amateurs, and Jos. W. Stern & Co. promoted it vigorously, if briefly. By summer 1918, however, it had receded from view, to be supplanted two years later by a nearly identical title, "Keep the Lovelight Burning," by Billy Baskette.

References 

1917 songs
Songs of World War I
Songs with music by Jimmy McHugh
Songs with lyrics by Jack Caddigan